In mathematics, the discrete exterior calculus (DEC) is the extension of the exterior calculus to discrete spaces including graphs, finite element meshes, and lately also general polygonal meshes (non-flat and non-convex). DEC methods have proved to be very powerful in improving and analyzing finite element methods: for instance, DEC-based methods allow the use of highly non-uniform meshes to obtain accurate results. Non-uniform meshes are advantageous because they allow the use of large elements where the process to be simulated is relatively simple, as opposed to a fine resolution where the process may be complicated (e.g., near an obstruction to a fluid flow), while using less computational power than if a uniformly fine mesh were used.

The discrete exterior derivative

Stokes' theorem relates the integral of a differential (n − 1)-form ω over the boundary ∂M of an n-dimensional manifold M to the integral of dω (the exterior derivative of ω, and a differential n-form on M) over M itself:

One could think of differential k-forms as linear operators that act on k-dimensional "bits" of space, in which case one might prefer to use the bracket notation for a dual pairing. In this notation, Stokes' theorem reads as

In finite element analysis, the first stage is often the approximation of the domain of interest by a triangulation, T. For example, a curve would be approximated as a union of straight line segments; a surface would be approximated by a union of triangles, whose edges are straight line segments, which themselves terminate in points. Topologists would refer to such a construction as a simplicial complex. The boundary operator on this triangulation/simplicial complex T is defined in the usual way: for example, if L is a directed line segment from one point, a, to another, b, then the boundary ∂L of L is the formal difference b − a.

A k-form on T is a linear operator acting on k-dimensional subcomplexes of T; e.g., a 0-form assigns values to points, and extends linearly to linear combinations of points; a 1-form assigns values to line segments in a similarly linear way. If ω is a k-form on T, then the discrete exterior derivative dω of ω is the unique (k + 1)-form defined so that Stokes' theorem holds:

For every (k + 1)-dimensional subcomplex of T, S.

Other operators and operations such as the discrete wedge product, Hodge star, or Lie derivative can also be defined.

See also
Discrete differential geometry
Discrete Morse theory
Topological combinatorics
Discrete calculus

Notes

References
A simple and complete discrete exterior calculus on general polygonal meshes, Ptackova, Lenka and Velho, Luiz, Computer Aided Geometric Design, 2021, DOI: 10.1016/j.cagd.2021.102002
Discrete Calculus, Grady, Leo J., Polimeni, Jonathan R., 2010
Hirani Thesis on Discrete Exterior Calculus
A Primal-to-Primal Discretization of Exterior Calculus on Polygonal Meshes, Ptackova, L. and Velho, L., Symposium on Geometry Processing 2017, DOI: 10.2312/SGP.20171204
Convergence of discrete exterior calculus approximations for Poisson problems, E. Schulz & G. Tsogtgerel, Disc. Comp. Geo. 63(2), 346 - 376, 2020
On geometric discretization of elasticity, Arash Yavari, J. Math. Phys. 49, 022901 (2008), DOI:10.1063/1.2830977
Discrete Differential Geometry: An Applied Introduction, Keenan Crane, 2018

Finite element method
Multilinear algebra